Harold von Schmidt (May 19, 1893 – June 3, 1982) was an American illustrator, who specialized in magazine interior illustrations.

Early life
Born in Alameda, California in 1893, he was orphaned at the age of five. After a year in an orphanage, he went to live with his Aunt Lily Von Schmidt, an artist in her own right, and her second husband, Major Charles Lee Tilden, who had been a forty-niner, and founder of Tilden Park in Alameda County. As a youth, von Schmidt worked as a cowhand and a construction worker. In 1920 and 1924, he was on the United States Olympic Rugby team along with his cousin Charles Lee Tilden Jr. Although the United States team won the gold medal both years, von Schmidt did not play in the only game in 1920, and was sidelined by an injury in the final practice in 1924.

Career
Von Schmidt began his art studies at the California School of Arts and Crafts while he was still in high school. In 1924, he entered the Grand Central School of Art in New York City. He moved to the suburban community of New Rochelle which was a well-known artist colony and home to many of the top commercial illustrators of the day such as Frank and J. C. Leyendecker and Norman Rockwell.
Also in residence were Al Parker, Mead Schaeffer and Dean Cornwell, who, along with Tom Lovell and N. C. Wyeth would become leaders in the field.
 
He later married and moved to Westport, Connecticut.

Harold von Schmidt's work appeared primarily in Collier's Weekly, Cosmopolitan, Liberty, The Saturday Evening Post, and Sunset. Although he preferred magazine work and illustrated few books, he spent two years preparing sixty illustrations for a deluxe edition of Willa Cather's Death Comes for the Archbishop. In 1948, he was recruited by Albert Dorne to be one of the founding faculty for the Famous Artists School. He was awarded the first gold medal by the trustees of the National Cowboy Hall of Fame in 1968.

Death
Harold died on June 3, 1982 in Westport, Connecticut.

Family
Harold's son Eric Von Schmidt was a well-known singer-songwriter associated with Bob Dylan.

References

Bibliography
Reed, Walt. Harold Von Schmidt Draws and Paints the Old West. Flagstaff, AZ: Northland Press, 1972. 
Von Schmidt, Harold. The Forty-Niners: An Exhibition of Paintings. Ottumwa, Iowa: John Morrell & Co, 1949. 
Von Schmidt, Harold, and John M. Carroll. Von Schmidt, the Complete Illustrator. [Fort Collins, CO]: Old Army Press, 1973. 
Von Schmidt, Harold, and Walt Reed. The Western Art of Harold Von Schmidt. New York: Peacock Press/Bantam Book, 1976.

External links
*Rugby at the Olympics - retrieved July 31, 2006 
Biography of Harold von Schmidt - retrieved July 31, 2006
The Illustrated Gallery - Harold von Schmidt - retrieved July 31, 2006
The Rugby History Society

American illustrators
1893 births
1982 deaths
Artists from New Rochelle, New York
United States international rugby union players
Presidents of the Society of Illustrators